The Beu is a right tributary of the river Nera in Romania. It discharges into the Nera upstream from Sasca Română. The upper reach of the river is also known as Beu Sec or Răcăjdianu.

Gallery

References

Rivers of Romania
Rivers of Caraș-Severin County